José Baudilio Hernández Maceda (born 17 October 1961) is a Venezuelan football manager and former player. He is the current manager of Atlético Venezuela.

Career
Born in Caracas, Hernández played as a senior for Centro Atlético, Marítimo de Venezuela and Universidad Central de Venezuela before retiring due to injuries. He began his managerial career in 1985, while in charge of C.S. Colegio San Agustín El Paraíso's youth categories.

Hernández joined Caracas in 1995, being initially a manager of the youth sides before taking over the B-team in 2003. In 2007, he was appointed manager of Primera División side Minervén.

Hernández left Minervén in 2009, and had a short period in charge of Deportivo Anzoátegui before being appointed at the helm of Mineros. He left the latter in 2010, being appointed manager of Atlético Venezuela in the following year.

Hernández joined the Venezuelan Football Federation in 2015, as manager of the under-17 national team. On 16 August 2019, he was named at the helm of the under-20 side.

In October 2021, Hernández returned to Atlético Venezuela, replacing Jair Díaz.

Personal life
Hernández's father Nerio Hernández was also a manager. His son Igor is also a footballer.

References

External links
 

1961 births
Living people
Footballers from Caracas
Venezuelan football managers
Venezuelan Primera División managers
Deportivo Anzoátegui managers
Mineros de Guayana managers
Atlético Venezuela C.F. managers